Donald G. Telford (c. 1902 – c. 1980) was a rugby union player who represented Australia.

Telford, a lock, was born in Manly, New South Wales and claimed 1 international rugby cap for Australia.

References

Australian rugby union players
Australia international rugby union players
Year of death missing
Year of birth uncertain
People from Manly, New South Wales
Rugby union players from Sydney
Rugby union locks